The men's team épée was a fencing event held as part of the Fencing at the 1920 Summer Olympics programme. It was the third appearance of the event. Eleven nations competed.

Rosters

Results

Semifinals

Final

References

Sources
 
 

Fencing at the 1920 Summer Olympics